Abdulsalam Haykal (born July 14, 1978, in Damascus) is a Syrian technology and media entrepreneur, who lives and works in Abu Dhabi, United Arab Emirates. He is the co-founder of Haykal Media, one of the Middle East’s main provider of digital knowledge and information platforms in Arabic, with several flagship products including the Arabic editions of Harvard Business Review, MIT Technology Review, Stanford Social Innovation Review, Popular Science, the new magazine Aliqtisadi, the English monthly Forward Magazine and Manhom (a large directory of individuals and companies in the Arabic language). The Report: Emerging Syria 2008 listed Haykal Media with its magazines and online media as one of three main players in the media sector in Syria. Haykal is also the founder and a board member of Transtek, an enterprise software development firm.

Early life
Haykal studied at the American University of Beirut, and the School of Oriental and African Studies (SOAS), University of London. In June 2007, he was elected as an alumni trustee of the American University of Beirut. He is also a trustee of the University of Kalamoon, a private higher education institution in Syria. In April 2010, he was invited by the Obama Administration to the Presidential Summit on Entrepreneurship, in recognition of his business development activities.

Career and roles
Haykal was the president of the Syrian Young Entrepreneurs Association (SYEA), an NGO formed as part of the reform process in Syria. He was also a founder and trustee in several other organizations including BIDAYA Foundation, an NGO to help young people to become entrepreneurs by providing business mentoring and charitable micro-loans;  and Tumuhi, a national college scholarship fund.

Haykal is founder and chairman of Lableb Labs is focused on Arabic-natural language processing (NLP) products including enterprise and in-site search, consumer search, and other tools in syntax, semantics, discourse and speech.

Haykal currently serves on the board of trustees of the American University of Beirut. He is a member of the United Aarab Emirates government's Arabic Language Advisory Council, chaired by the Minister of Culture. Abdulsalam is also a member of the advisory board of the Communication Arts Centre at the Lebanese American University.

Awards
In 2009, the World Economic Forum named Haykal as a Young Global Leader, the first Syrian to receive this recognition. He also received the Arab Thought Foundation's Innovation Award in 2015.

References 

Living people
1978 births
Businesspeople in software
Businesspeople in mass media
American University of Beirut alumni
People from Damascus
Alumni of SOAS University of London
Syrian magazine founders
Syrian chief executives
Syrian writers
American University of Beirut trustees